Argissidae is a family of amphipods belonging to the order Amphipoda.

Genera:
 Argissa Boeck, 1871
 Chimaeropsis Meinert, 1890

References

Amphipoda
Crustacean families